Jamarco Jones (born June 4, 1996) is an American football guard for the Tennessee Titans of the National Football League (NFL). He played college football at Ohio State. He started his final 27 games at Ohio State at left tackle.

Professional career

Seattle Seahawks
Jones was drafted by the Seattle Seahawks in the fifth round, 168th overall, of the 2018 NFL Draft. He was placed on injured reserve on September 1, 2018.

On October 3, 2019, Jones replaced right guard D.J. Fluker who was injured during a Thursday Night Football game against the Los Angeles Rams. Prior to this point Jones had never played the guard position before. The Seahawks defeated the Rams 30-29. On December 19, 2020, Jones was placed on injured reserve.

On November 27, 2021, Jones was placed on injured reserve. He was activated on January 1, 2022.

Tennessee Titans
On March 17, 2022, Jones signed a two-year contract with the Tennessee Titans. He was placed on injured reserve on September 22, 2022.

References

External links
 Ohio State Buckeyes bio
Seattle Seahawks bio

1996 births
Living people
American football offensive tackles
Ohio State Buckeyes football players
Players of American football from Chicago
Seattle Seahawks players
Tennessee Titans players